Fukang is a Chinese automobile manufacturer that specializes in developing electric vehicles.

History 

Fukang was founded in 1994. Originally being the name of a compact car of Dongfeng-Citroën, and later, Dongfeng Fukang. The model name is well known for being an affordable compact vehicle in China, so later Dongfeng started using the name for cheap and durable rebadged versions of their compact products, and even later, a brand focusing on affordable entry-level ride-hailing and taxi industry vehicles. Most of their vehicles are rebadged electric versions of Dongfeng Peugeot-Citroën and Dongfeng-Nissan.

Vehicles

Current Models 
Apart from completely rebadged Fukang products, Fukang is also responsible for the production and sales of several electric variants of Dongfeng Peugeot-Citroën vehicles. Fukang has 5 production vehicles.

See also 
 Ciwei

References 

Electric vehicle manufacturers of China
Car brands
Car manufacturers of China
Chinese brands